Luis Carlos Simigliani Carpio (born 15 June 1999) is a Venezuelan footballer who plays as a forward for Chilean side Universidad de Chile.

Club career
Simigliani marked his debut on January 28, 2017 with a goal; a 90th minute consolation in a 4–1 loss to Deportivo La Guaira. His second goal came in only his third game, and was the winner in a 2–1 victory over Trujillanos.

Career statistics

Club

References

1999 births
Living people
Venezuelan footballers
Association football forwards
Venezuelan Primera División players
Atlético Socopó players